Tashlytamak (Taşlıtamaq) is a rural locality (a village) in Imay-Karmalinsky Selsoviet, Davlekanovsky District, Bashkortostan, Russia. The population was 113 as of 2010. There are 3 streets.

Geography 
Tashlytamak is located 27 km east of Davlekanovo (the district's administrative centre) by road. Imay-Karmaly is the nearest rural locality.

References 

Rural localities in Davlekanovsky District